Ceferino Hugo Raúl Denis (born 9 November 1978) was an Argentine footballer. His last club was Unión San Felipe.

References
 
 Ceferino Hugo Raúl Denis at SoccerPunter.com

1978 births
Living people
Argentine footballers
Argentine expatriate footballers
Argentinos Juniors footballers
Deportivo Morón footballers
Gimnasia y Tiro footballers
Unión San Felipe footballers
Expatriate footballers in Chile
Expatriate footballers in Mexico
Association football defenders
People from Ituzaingó Partido
Sportspeople from Buenos Aires Province